Dicliptera tinctoria is the accepted name of a species in the family Acanthaceae (previously described here as the synonyms Peristrophe bivalvis (L.) Merr. and P. roxburghiana).  It may be called magenta plant, or lá cẩm in Vietnamese and native to southeastern Asia from Assam south to Sri Lanka and east to mainland Southeast Asia, Java, southern China, and Taiwan.

Description
It is a herbaceous perennial plant growing to 0.3–1 m tall. The leaves are lanceolate to ovoid-acute, 20–75 mm long and 10–35 mm wide. The flowers are two-lobed, the long axis up to 50 mm long; they are magenta to reddish-violet.

Cultivation and uses

Culinary use

An extract of its leaves is used as a food dye, and imparts a magenta tone to some Vietnamese foods, particularly in a taro-filled cake called bánh da lợn and glutinous rice dishes such as xôi lá cẩm, a sweet dessert.

Medicinal use
The plant is used in traditional Chinese medicine. The leaves have been used in water extract decoctions for the treatment of ailments including cough, dysentery, diarrhoea and bronchitis.

References

Links
Magenta plant page
Chinese names
Photo
Photo

Acanthaceae
Flora of Indo-China
Lamiales of Asia